Shenandoah Peak is a summit in the U.S. state of Nevada.

A variant name is "Shenandoah Mountain". The name is a transfer from the Shenandoah Valley, in Virginia.

References

Mountains of Clark County, Nevada